Tommy Steel was a soccer goalkeeper who earned one cap with the U.S. national team in 1925. He also spent five seasons in the American Soccer League.

Professional career
Born in Glasgow, Scotland, Steel emigrated with sister Jessie and brother Sandy(also a goalkeeper)to Fall River he began his career in the United States with Fore River of the Southern New England Soccer League.  In 1924, he signed with the Boston Wonder Workers of the American Soccer League, playing two seasons with them. In 1926, he joined the New Bedford Whalers, but moved to the Fall River Marksmen eight games into the 1928–29 season. He played only one game with Fall River before finishing his career with Philadelphia Field Club.  He retired in 1929.

National team
Steel earned his cap with the U.S. national team in an 8 November 1925 victory over Canada.

See also
List of United States men's international soccer players born outside the United States

References

External links
 Newspaper account of national team game

Footballers from Glasgow
Scottish emigrants to the United States
United States men's international soccer players
Association football goalkeepers
Southern New England Soccer League players
Fore River players
American Soccer League (1921–1933) players
Boston Soccer Club players
New Bedford Whalers players
Fall River Marksmen players
Philadelphia Field Club players
Year of birth missing
Year of death missing
American soccer players
Scottish footballers